Oberea ulmicola is a species of beetle in the family Cerambycidae. It was described by Chittenden in 1904. It is known from North America. It feeds on Prunus virginiana.

References

Beetles described in 1904
ulmicola